Philipp Herder (born 21 October 1992) is a retired German artistic gymnast who represented Germany at the 2020 Summer Olympics in Tokyo, Japan.

Career 
In 2011, Herder had a neck injury that required surgery to replace a disk with two fused vertebrae, and he temporarily retired from the sport, but he returned at the 2014 World Championships. Herder competed at the 2015 World Championships and helped the German team finish ninth in the qualification round.

Herder competed at the 2016 Olympic Test Event and won the gold medal with the German team which allowed Germany to send a full team to the 2016 Olympic Games. Herder was selected as an alternate for Germany's 2016 Olympic team.

Herder was selected to represent Germany at the 2020 Summer Olympics alongside Lukas Dauser, Nils Dunkel, and Andreas Toba.

On October 24, 2022 Herder announced his retirement from elite gymnastics but said he still planned on competing in bundesliga.

References

External links
 

1992 births
Living people
German male artistic gymnasts
Gymnasts from Berlin
Gymnasts at the 2020 Summer Olympics
Olympic gymnasts of Germany
20th-century German people
21st-century German people